Butadiene
Chemical data pages cleanup